Liquid Room 20050403 Official Bootleg is a live album by the Japanese horror punk band Balzac. The album is an official bootleg of the same show at which the live video DVD, with the same name, was made. Both the CD and the DVD were supplied in the limited "Liquid Room Box Set", with a photograph book and other items. Recorded at the Liquid Room venue in 2005, the numbers in the title represent the date of the event.

Track listing
"Beyond Evil 308 Pt. 1"
"D.a.r.K"
"Blood Inside '68"
"Into The Light of the 13 Dark Night"
"Gyakusatsu-no-mukougawa"
"XXXxxx"
"Shi wo yubi sasu"
"Inside my eyes"
"Came Out of the Grave"
"Yami-no-hikari-e"
"Beyond Evil 308 Pt. 2"
"Day The Earth Caught Fire"
"Art of Dying"
"The World Without End"
"I Can't Stand It Anymore"
"In Your Face"
"The Silence of Crows"
"The End of Century"
"Nowhere #13"
"Violent Paradise"
"(Intro)"
"The Human Blood"
"Monster I"
"No Resistance 1968"
"Unvarnished Facts"

Bonus DVD tracks
"Art of Dying - The World Without End"
"I Can't Stand It Anymore"
"Blood Inside '68"
"XXXxxx"
"(This is the Zodiac speaking)"

Credits
 Hirosuke - vocals
 Atsushi - guitar, vocals, chorus
 Akio - bass guitar, chorus
 Takayuki - drums, chorus

External links
Official Balzac Japan site
Official Balzac USA site
Official Balzac Europe site

Balzac (band) albums
2005 live albums
2005 video albums
Live video albums